The Montreal Expos Player of the Year award was voted by the Montreal chapter of the Baseball Writers' Association of America (BBWAA) at the end of each season, until the Montreal Expos moved to Washington, D.C., US, following the  season.



Winners

1969- Rusty Staub
1970- Carl Morton
1971- Ron Hunt
1972- Mike Marshall
1973- Mike Marshall
1974- Willie Davis
1975- Gary Carter
1976- Woodie Fryman
1977- Gary Carter
1978- Ross Grimsley
1979- Larry Parrish
1980- Gary Carter
1981- Andre Dawson
1982- Al Oliver
1983- Tim Raines & Andre Dawson
1984- Gary Carter
1985- Tim Raines
1986- Tim Raines
1987- Tim Wallach
1988- Andrés Galarraga
1989- Tim Wallach
1990- Tim Wallach
1991- Dennis Martínez
1992- Larry Walker
1993- Marquis Grissom
1994- Moisés Alou
1995- David Segui
1996- Henry Rodriguez
1997- Pedro Martínez
1998- Vladimir Guerrero
1999- Vladimir Guerrero
2000- Vladimir Guerrero
2001- Orlando Cabrera
2002- Vladimir Guerrero
2003- Orlando Cabrera
2004- Brad Wilkerson

See also
 
 Montreal Expos Hall of Fame

References

Player
Major League Baseball team trophies and awards
Canadian sports trophies and awards
Quebec awards
Baseball most valuable player awards
Most valuable player awards
Awards established in 1969
Awards disestablished in 2004
Washington Nationals lists